Isam Dart (1858–October 3, 1900), also known as Isom, was a cattle driver, rancher, and horse and cattle rustler during the late 19th century in the Wild West. He settled in Browns Park in northwestern Colorado, where he was considered by his neighbors to be a "superlative rider and roper, a good neighbor, and an expert and industrious cattle thief." He and his partner Mat Rash were gunned down in separate events and were believed to have been assassinated by Tom Horn, a hired gunman.

In 1927, a biographical fiction book about a Black cowboy was published that erroneously stated that Dart was born in Arkansas nine years before his birth. It also incorrectly stated that Dart also went by the name Ned Huddleston.

Early years
According to the Museum of Northwest Colorado, Dart was born in Texas about 1858. His father was Cyrus (also Silas) Dart, a farmer in Seguin, Texas. He had a sister and two brothers. The family lived amongst a diverse community of Hispanics, Native Americans, Blacks, and whites. He began earning money wrangling cattle in his teens, when he rounded up wild cattle. He worked at the Goodnight Ranch. He stole horses with a man named Terresa.

Wyoming and Browns Park
In 1881, Dart was one of a group of men who drove cattle north to Wyoming Territory. He worked on a large ranch there, wrangling horses. He worked as a cook at a railroad construction camp between Green River and Rock Springs of the Wyoming Territory.

In 1883, Dart was a member of a cattle drive to the Browns Park area in northwestern Colorado, near the borders with Wyoming and Utah. He worked for Herb and Elizabeth Bassett in Browns Park. The couple had five children, including Josie and Ann Bassett, who became famous. Due to the lack of law enforcement, the area attracted outlaws, like Butch Cassidy and the Wild Bunch, which meant that ranchers were reluctant to take full use of the open range land.

While working for the Bassetts, Dart was a ranch hand who also cooked meals, washed laundry, cut wood, and performed other household duties. Elizabeth Bassett was believed to be the mastermind of a group of cattle thieves, a group that included Dart. Dart was fond of children and babysat the children of Josie Bassett and her husband Jim McKnight. He played the harmonica and fiddle. Dart sang for the children, put on shows for them, and taught them how to ride and rope.

Dart was accomplished and considered a skilled bronco buster and a "top hand among cowboys". Joe Davenport, his friend, stated in 1929 that "I have seen all the great riders. But for all-around skill as a cowman, Isam Dart was unexcelled and I never saw his peer". Although it was common for African Americans to be subjected to hostility at that time, he was well-respected. He and Madison (Mat) Rash ran their own cattle operations and were accused of rustling cattle.

He was known as a notorious outlaw, but he was never convicted. In one case, Dart was said to have been arrested by a deputy sheriff, who drove the two men in a buckboard wagon and headed for jail. The wagon slipped off the side of a mountain and the deputy was injured. Dart rescued the deputy, gave him first aid, and then surrendered to the sheriff. The deputy was a character witness for Dart in his trial. As the result of his testimony, Dart was acquitted of his crime.

In addition to being a cattle rancher and rustler, Dart captured, broke in, and sold wild horses that were branded with "I D Bar". J.S. Hoy, a cattle rancher, intended to remove small ranchers from the area. His ranch was burned down and Dart and two other men were charged with the crime. Dart was taken to a jail north of Steamboat Springs on Hahns Peak, where he awaited the start of the trial for arson in 1890. He escaped from the jail, laid low in Denver for some time, and returned to Browns Park in 1894. He was not tried for arson.

In 1898, Dart was a member of a posse that tracked down men who had killed a teenager, Willie Strang, in Brown's Park. They cornered the men on a rocky hillside where Harry Tracy killed Valentine Hoy.

Colorado Range War
The Colorado Range War began by 1899 when large ranchers hired Tom Horn, a stock detective and former Pinkerton detective.  His arrangement included a $500 payment for each rustler that was killed. The money came from the stockmen's association dues. Horn assumed the persona of a horse buyer to gain evidence of rustlers, which was found to include Dart. Dart lived near Cold Spring Mountain's summit near Browns Park. After Matt Rush was killed on July 8, 1900, Dart invited his friends—including Sam and George Bassett—to stay at his cabin, which he assumed would be safe. On October 3, 1900, Dart was shot and killed instantly as he walked from his cabin to his corral.  The Bassetts heard the gunshot, but saw no sign of the shooter. Eb Bassett removed leather wrist cuffs from Dart's body before he was buried. Dart was buried near his cabin. By the time of his death, Dart and his partner Mat Rash were said to have amassed two good ranches and a lot of cattle and horses.

An impaneled jury found that "Isam Dart came to his death, by a rifle shot at the hands of a party unknown". Tom Horn was charged in 1902 with killing a fourteen-year-old boy, Willie Nickels, the son of the rancher Kels P. Nickels, in July 1901. Journalists suspected Horn of killing Dart and Rash.

Erroneous historical information
According to the Museum of Northwest Colorado and others, much of what is known about Isam Dart has been erroneous. Dart was not Ned Huddleston and was not born into slavery in Arkansas.

The museum states:

The erroneous information about Dart began with W.G. Tittsworth's book "Outskirt Episodes" that was published in 1927 and subsequent books repeated the story. One modern author said that Tittsworth's book was at least two-thirds fiction. As an example, there are no public records for Ned Huddleston and researchers found that no one who knew Dart knew of Huddleston.

Popular culture
 He was portrayed by Danny Glover in Hannah's Law (2012 film).
 Louis Gossett Jr. played the role of Isom Picket, which was a fictional character based upon Bill Picket and Isam Dart, in the Return to Lonesome Dove (1993 television film).

See also
 Dr. John Parsons Cabin Complex
 History of slavery in Colorado
 List of African American pioneers of Colorado
 Bill Pickett
 Bose Ikard
 Nat Love

Notes

References

Further reading
 
 
 

1849 births
1900 deaths
People from Arkansas
Outlaws of the American Old West
American cattlemen
People from Routt County, Colorado
American freedmen
19th-century African-American people
African-American equestrians